Chicago, Illinois to Los Angeles, California.

Results

References

American Solar Challenge